The Native Council of Nova Scotia represents about 25,000 Mi’kmaq/Aboriginal peoples who are non-status or live off-reserve in Nova Scotia and issues its own identity cards. It works to improve their social, economic and political situation. Its head office is in Truro, and it has offices in Sydney, Nova Scotia, Liverpool, Dartmouth, Digby and Coldbrook.

Identity issues
According to Canada's 2016 census, 51,495 Nova Scotians claim Aboriginal identity, but only 18,940 were considered “status Indians”, and 40.1 per cent of those live outside reserves. Many individuals choose to live off-reserve and relocate to an urban area like Halifax to seek education, employment or other economic opportunities. They are no longer members of Nova Scotia’s 13 on-reserve bands and are not included in the Mi'kmaq-Nova Scotia-Canada Tripartite Forum. They are not consulted over decisions related to natural resources and environment, and lose their land and hunting rights. The Daniels decision in 2016 ruled that non-status Indians have the legal right to be considered “Indians” under  Canada's Constitution of 1867, but  it was unclear what changes federal and provincial governments would make.

Programs
The Helping Prepare for Employment/Education (HYPE) project announced in 2017 will provide First Nations youth with employment workshops and work placement opportunities. The Council supports healthy eating programs.

Politics
The Council are opposed to hydraulic fracturing for oil and gas. Following the Daniels ruling, the Council are pressing both levels of government to negotiate tangible changes in access to social services, education, health care, and entitlements to commercial fishing.

References

External links
Native Council of Nova Scotia

Indigenous organizations in Nova Scotia